Stepan Poistogov (born 14 December 1986) is a Russian middle-distance runner. He competed in the 800 metre event at the 2014 IAAF World Indoor Championships. He was married to fellow middle-distance runner Ekaterina Poistogova.

References

1986 births
Living people
Russian male middle-distance runners
Place of birth missing (living people)